Sergio Lozano Lluch (born 24 March 1999), is a Spanish footballer who plays for Villarreal CF B as a midfielder.

Club career
Born in Alzira, Valencia, Lozano graduated from the youth setup of local Villarreal CF. On 11 February 2017, he made his debut for the reserves in a 3–2 defeat against Valencia CF B. On 28 August 2017, he made his debut for the C-team in a 0–0 draw against Crevillente Deportivo.

Lozano made his first team debut for the senior team on 7 December 2017, replacing fellow debutant Manu Morlanes in the 76th minute of a 1–0 defeat against Maccabi Tel Aviv in the UEFA Europa League. He scored his first senior goal on 1 September 2019, netting the equalizer for the B's in a 2–1 away win against Hércules CF.

On 13 August 2020, Lozano was loaned to Segunda División newcomers FC Cartagena for the season. On 26 December, after featuring rarely, he was recalled by his parent club.

International career
On 24 September 2014, Lozano was called to the Spain under-16 team. In the following year, he was awarded by the Valencian Football Federation for his performance with the youth side.

References

External links

1999 births
Living people
People from Ribera Alta (comarca)
Sportspeople from the Province of Valencia
Spanish footballers
Association football midfielders
Spain youth international footballers
Segunda División players
Primera Federación players
Segunda División B players
Tercera División players
Villarreal CF C players
Villarreal CF B players
Villarreal CF players
FC Cartagena footballers